Richart Elliott Slusher (born 1938) is a regents researcher and a principal research scientist at the Georgia Tech Research Institute, and the director of the Georgia Tech Quantum Institute.

Education
Slusher received a Ph.D. in physics from the University of California at Berkeley in 1965.

Work
Slusher worked at Bell Laboratories from 1965 to 2007, where he directed a research department focused on optical and quantum device physics from 1977 to 2005. Since 2005, he has worked at the Georgia Tech Research Institute.

Awards
Slusher received the 1989 Einstein Prize for Laser Science, the 1995 Arthur L. Schawlow Prize in Laser Science from the American Physical Society and the 2006 Max Born Award from the Optical Society of America.

Publications

References

External links
Dick Slusher's page at Georgia Tech
GTRI official website

1938 births
Living people
University of California, Berkeley alumni
Georgia Tech Research Institute people
Georgia Tech faculty
Theoretical computer scientists
Fellows of the American Physical Society